Winogradskyella psychrotolerans is a Gram-negative and rod-coccus shaped bacterium from the genus of Winogradskyella which has been isolated from sediments from Kongsfjorden.

References

Flavobacteria
Bacteria described in 2013